"Daddy DJ" is a song recorded by French dance act of the same name. It was their debut single from their first album Let Your Body Talk and was first released in France in 1999, and then in many European countries between April and June 2000. The music video was produced as an animated feature.

Commercial success 
The song was a huge success across Europe and has been well received, entering the top ten in France, Finland, Denmark, Germany, Spain, the Netherlands and Flanders (Belgium) and even topping the singles charts in Sweden, Norway and Wallonia (Belgium). As of August 2014, the song was the 24th best-selling single of the 21st century in France, with 525,000 units sold.

Cover versions

In January 2006, the song's melody was sampled by Australian DJ S3RL on the song "Pretty Rave Girl".

Also in 2006, the song was sampled by Swedish singer Basshunter in his song "Vi sitter i Ventrilo och spelar DotA" (also known as simply "DotA"). In 2008, this was then adapted into the song "All I Ever Wanted".

In 2009, the song was covered by Crazy Frog from his album Everybody Dance Now. The song entered the French Singles Chart at a peak of number four and totaled 15 weeks in the top 50. The song debuted at number 14 on the Eurochart Hot 100 Singles, dropping 18 places to number 32 the following week.

Another successful cover version is the 2013 track "Take It to the Limit" by the German DJ and producer Max K. featuring vocals by singer Gerald G and rapper Nitro. It was also covered in 2015 by The Alex Cortez Project featuring CVB as "Let's Get Started".

In June 2022, Italian DJ Gabry Ponte and Austrian DJ Lum!x sampled the song in their song "We Could Be Together".

Music video
The animated music video for the song was produced by Aladin Net Prod and was released in France in 1999 and in 2000 elsewhere.

The video starts out with the act's main protagonist Kross, a 13 year old boy who is an aspiring DJ, watching his father practice for performing at a club. After his father refuses to play a Daddy DJ record he likes, Kross is frustrated later that night when his dad leaves for the club. The next day, his father is really tired but in the evening performs back at the club again. Kross uses his computer webcam to transport himself into the club, while simultaneously his father is teleported into his son's room. Everyone enjoys Kross's skills and an agent signs Kross with a record deal. He becomes famous and at the end of the video he is seen talking on the phone with an unknown person in an office in a large building labeled "Daddy DJ's Records."

Track listings
 CD single
 "Daddy DJ" (Chico and Tonio radio edit) — 3:36
 "Daddy DJ" (original extended mix) — 5:46
 CD maxi
 "Daddy DJ" (Chico and Tonio radio edit) — 3:38
 "Daddy DJ" (original radio edit) — 3:44
 "Daddy DJ" (G-box 2 steps lullaby mix) — 3:41

Charts and sales

Weekly charts

Year-end charts

Certifications

Crazy Frog version

In 2009, "Daddy DJ" was covered by Swedish character Crazy Frog and released as a single on July, 13 off its third album Everybody Dance Now. It went straight to number four on the French Singles Chart.

Charts
The song entered the French Singles Chart at a peak of number four, and totaled 15 weeks in the top 50. The song debuted at number 14 on the Eurochart Hot 100 Singles, dropping 18 places to number 32 the following week.

Weekly charts

Year-end charts

References

Songs about fathers
2000 singles
Daddy DJ songs
Eurodance songs
Ultratop 50 Singles (Wallonia) number-one singles
Number-one singles in Norway
Number-one singles in Sweden
1999 debut singles
Crazy Frog songs
1999 songs
Animated music videos
Sony Music singles
Songs written by David Le Roy
Songs written by Jean Christophe Belval
Songs containing the I–V-vi-IV progression